This is a list of sportspeople who have played both first-class cricket and top level football in England. The list includes thirteen sportspeople who are dual internationals, having represented England's national team at both sports.

Footballers who have not competed at a professional level in the Football League are only eligible for inclusion if they have represented the England national football team.

Double internationals

England cricket team and professional football

First-class cricket and England football team

First-class cricket and professional football

See also
List of Scottish cricket and football players

References

External links
Multi-talented Footballers - Guardian article
All Round Sporting Heroes - Chesterfield FC website

English
Football players
Cricket and football players
Association football player non-biographical articles